Sadī is a crater on Mercury.  Its name was adopted by the International Astronomical Union (IAU) in 1976, after Persian poet Saadi Shirazi.

References

Impact craters on Mercury